The Tomahawk Fire was the second-largest wildfire of the May 2014 San Diego County wildfires, behind the Pulgas Fire. The fire, which started on May 14 around 9:45 AM, on the Naval Weapons Station Seal Beach Detachment Fallbrook (also known as Fallbrook Naval Weapons Station), scorched . The Fallbrook Naval Weapons Station is on the eastern side of, and provides an entry point to, Marine Corps Base Camp Pendleton and is adjacent to the community of Fallbrook. Evacuation orders were issued for several schools and housing areas, as well as the Fallbrook Naval Weapons Station and the closed San Onofre Nuclear Generating Station. On May 16, the fire had burned , and it was 23% contained. By May 17, it had burned  and was 65% contained. During the evening of May 18, the fire was reported to be 100% contained.

See also
October 2007 California wildfires
2014 California wildfires
December 2017 Southern California wildfires

References

2014 California wildfires
Wildfires in San Diego County, California